Terror of the Range is a 1919 American Western film serial directed by Stuart Paton. The film is considered to be lost.

Cast
 George Larkin as John Hardwick
 Betty Compson as Thelma Grant
 Horace B. Carpenter as James Grant (as H.B. Carpenter)
 Fred Malatesta as Black John (as Fred M. Malatesta)
 Ora Carew as Vampire
 True Boardman as Broncho Haryigan
 Walter MacNamara
 Alice Saunders
 William Quinn (as Billy Quinn)

See also
 List of film serials
 List of film serials by studio
 List of lost films

References

External links
 
 Terror of the Range at SilentEra

1919 films
1919 Western (genre) films
American silent serial films
American black-and-white films
Pathé Exchange film serials
Films directed by Stuart Paton
Lost Western (genre) films
Lost American films
1919 lost films
Silent American Western (genre) films
1910s American films
1910s English-language films